"Are You Growing Tired of My Love" is a single released by the British Rock band Status Quo in 1969. It was included on the album Spare Parts.

"Are You Growing Tired of My Love" was a ballad written by songwriter Anthony King. It was the first single to feature Rick Parfitt singing lead vocal.

Nancy Sinatra covered "Are You Growing Tired of My Love" as the B-side for her single "The Highway Song", later included on the 1996 reissue of her album Country My Way.

Track listing 
 "Are You Growing Tired of My Love" (A King) (3.33)
 "So Ends Another Life" (Lancaster) (3.10)

Chart position

References 

Status Quo (band) songs
1969 singles
Pye Records singles
Song recordings produced by John Schroeder (musician)
1969 songs